Aruppola is a suburb of Kandy, Sri Lanka. Aruppola is about 4 kilometers from the heart of the Kandy City. 

Aruppola is popular for its government-funded Technical College. The population of Aruppola consists of mostly middle-class families who work for both the government and the private sector. Arruppola shares a border with the longest river in Sri Lanka, which is Mahaweli river.

Maps
Aruppola in Sri Lanka road map

External links 
 Technical Education
 Trinity College

Populated places in Kandy District